Kaysar Dadour (Arabic: 
قيصر دادور; born 9 July 1989) is a Syrian-Brazilian actor. He became known after attending the 18th edition of Big Brother Brazil, which he was runner-up. His first prominent role as an actor was playing Fauze in the Brazilian telenovela Órfãos da Terra.

Early life
Dadour was born and raised in Aleppo, Syria. He is the son of Diane and George Dadour and has a younger sister named Celine. In 2011, Kaysar left his homeland, which was in civil war, and fled by car to Lebanon. From Lebanon, he traveled by plane to Ukraine and lived there for a few years. In 2014, he migrated to Curitiba, Brazil, in search of a better life and to bring his family to the country.

Career
In 2018, he joined Big Brother Brasil 18, where he was runner-up with 39.33% of the vote. At the end of September, using the prize received from the program, he managed to fulfill his dream and bring his whole family to Brazil after 7 years apart.

In 2018 made his debut as an actor playing a terrorist in the movie of the Carcereiros series shown on Rede Globo. In 2019, it integrated in the cast of the soap opera  Orfãos da Terra playing Fauze. In the plot, he is a Syrian who takes refuge in Brazil as one of the henchmen of Aziz Abdallah (Herson Capri), Extremely loyal to the boss, goes with Sheik to Brazil to capture Laila (Julia Dalavia) and Jamil (Renato Góes).

Despite being in his first TV character, the actor was praised by Web surfers.

Personal life 
In June 2019 he applied to obtain Brazilian citizenship. In October 2019 he obtained Brazilian citizenship through naturalization.

Filmography

Television

Film

Indications and awards

References

External links

1989 births
Living people
People from Aleppo
Syrian male television actors
Syrian refugees
Syrian emigrants to Brazil
People with acquired Brazilian citizenship
Brazilian people of Syrian descent
Brazilian male television actors
Male actors from Curitiba
Big Brother (franchise) contestants
Participants in Brazilian reality television series
Dancing with the Stars winners
Big Brother Brasil